Travassosula is a genus of moths in the family Saturniidae first described by Charles Duncan Michener in 1949.

Species
Travassosula mulierata Lemaire, 1971
Travassosula subfumata (Schaus, 1921)

References

Hemileucinae